

Colonel Freckles, a Quarter Horse stallion, was a cutting horse who earned $46,305.00 in National Cutting Horse Association (or NCHA) contests before retiring to a career at stud. He died in October 1986 from complications of eating blister beetles. Among his offspring are Nu Cash, Doc Jewl Bar, Reveille Bar, Just Plain Colonel, Master Jay, Colonel Hotrodder, Colonel Flip, and Colonel Barrachone.

Colonel Freckles was inducted into the AQHA Hall of Fame in 2004.

Pedigree

Notes

References

 All Breed Pedigree Pedigree of Colonel Freckles retrieved on August 9, 2007

External links
 Colonel Freckles at Quarter Horse Directory
 Colonel Freckles at Quarter Horse Legends

Cutting horses
American Quarter Horse sires
1973 animal births
1986 animal deaths
AQHA Hall of Fame (horses)